Virtua Tennis, known in Japan as , is a 1999 tennis arcade game created by Sega-AM3. The player competes through tennis tournaments in an arcade mode. It was ported to the Dreamcast in 2000, and to Windows in 2002. A Game Boy Advance version was also released in 2002, followed by an N-Gage version in 2003. For the home console market, the game was expanded with the introduction of the campaign mode.

A sequel, Virtua Tennis 2, was released for arcades in 2001 and was ported to the Dreamcast the same year and to the PlayStation 2 in 2002. An updated version was released on the PlayStation Portable in 2005, under the name Virtua Tennis: World Tour. 2006 saw the release of Virtua Tennis 3 for arcades (using the Sega Lindbergh hardware). Xbox 360, PlayStation 3, PlayStation Portable and Windows versions were released in 2007. Virtua Tennis 2009 was released in 2009 on the Windows, PS3, Xbox 360 and Wii platforms. Virtua Tennis 4 was released in 2011 on the same four platforms, but also had an arcade version which was released later, as well as a PlayStation Vita port released in 2012. The latest addition to the franchise, Virtua Tennis Challenge, was released in 2012 on Android and iOS.

Game modes

Arcade
The player must win 5 matches played on different surfaces and venues to win a tournament. If the player performs well enough, he is challenged by Master, one of the game's bosses.

Exhibition
This is a single match in which the options are customizable.

The match can be played as singles or doubles with up to 4 human players (2 for singles). The duration can be varied between one game and one set. Other options include the court that the match is played on and the skill of the opponent(s).

World Circuit
Users have to win matches and complete training exercises in order to progress and unlock new ones. The user enters with a rank of 300th, which improves as matches are won. These matches are unlocked by completing easier matches or training exercises. The focus of the training exercises are to be fun, rather than realistic. Each exercise has three levels, with the difficulty increasing progressively. By completing the hardest difficulty with a certain amount of time left or points scored, an outfit is unlocked, which players can wear in all modes.

Game Content

Playable Characters
  Jim Courier
  Cedric Pioline
  Tim Henman
  Tommy Haas
  Mark Phillipoussis
  Carlos Moyá
  Thomas Johansson
  Yevgeny Kafelnikov

Tour Competitions
  Australia Challenge
  French Cup
  U.S. Super Tennis
  The Old England Championships
 Sega Grand Match

Development
Virtua Tennis was developed by Sega AM3. The producer, Mie Kumagai, wanted to create a game that appealed to broad demographics of players, taking note of the large number of one-on-one fighting games that proliferated throughout Japanese arcades during the 1990s. She also wished to replicate the critical and commercial achievements of Sega AM2's soccer title Virtua Striker, which was directed by Satoshi Mifune and was a hit among a wide range of age groups. 
Kumagai began planning a game that could serve as a both a fun, casual experience and competitive, hardcore experience for people to play with friends and family in arcades and at home. Her initial proposal, a basketball game was rejected, while her alternative proposal, a tennis game, was accepted. However, the potential for the project's success was still met with a large amount of skepticism within Sega. After Kumagai acquired a programmer, they made a trip to a tennis school for research and began designing a unique paddle controller. By twisting this paddle, the user could switch between forehand and backhand shots, but after months of in-house experimentation it proved too difficult to operate. Taking advice from Mifune, the team simplified the controls to a more traditional joystick and buttons. User reception at location testing and in Sega's offices proved to be very positive and development thereafter was smooth. Sega executives feared the game's original Japanese title, Power Smash, would not translate well to overseas audiences. For its North American and European localizations, the name adopted the familiar Virtua label and was changed to Virtua Tennis.

Reception

The Dreamcast version received "universal acclaim", the Game Boy Advance version received "favorable" reviews, and the PC version received "average" reviews, while the N-Gage version received "generally unfavorable reviews", according to the review aggregation website Metacritic. Blake Fischer of NextGen called the Dreamcast version "The best four-player game in a long time, and an excellent single- and two-player diversion. Don't avoid this because it's not football – you'll get more playtime out of it than you think." In Japan, Famitsu gave the same console version a score of 33 out of 40.

Also in Japan, Game Machine listed the arcade version in their February 1, 2000 issue as the third most-successful arcade game of the previous year.

John Thompson of AllGame gave the same arcade version four-and-a-half stars out of five, saying, "With an excellent engine, beautiful graphics and sounds, and an intuitive, deep gameplay system, Virtua Tennis is one of the best arcade games in recent memory. Sega dominated arcades of the late '90s, and with excellent titles such as this, it's easy to see why." Bryan Melville, however, gave the Dreamcast version four stars, calling it "a game that will go down as one of the best arcade ports on the 128-bit system." Edge gave the same Dreamcast version eight out of ten, saying, "Were it not for the irritation caused by the almost unbeatable players in later stages and the inability to play more than a single set per match, Virtua Tennis would have been a near-perfect sports game." The D-Pad Destroyer of GamePro called the same console version "one of the most purely fun sports games in a long time, up there with Sega Bass Fishing in the Games You're Embarrassed To Enjoy category. If you're a sports fan, go get it." Four-Eyed Dragon said of the Game Boy Advance version, "Even with sluggish controls and so-so visuals, Virtua Tennis still delivers, especially in the winning career mode where you train your custom-made athletes (both male and female) to become the number-one ranked in the world."

The Dreamcast version has been ranked in the top 100 games of all time by IGN both in 2005 (#91) and 2003 (#89). Game Informer placed the Dreamcast version 50th on their top 100 video games of all time in 2001. It was also featured in Guinness World Records 2017: Gamer's Edition where it says that the Dreamcast version got GameRankings score of 91.37% based on 33 reviews.

The Dreamcast version was a runner-up for the "Best Multiplayer Game" and "Best Sports Game (Traditional)" awards at GameSpots Best and Worst of 2000 Awards, both of which went to Quake III Arena and NFL 2K1, respectively. Two years later, the Game Boy Advance version was also a runner-up for the website's "Best Sports Game on Game Boy Advance" award, which went to Tony Hawk's Pro Skater 3. The PC version was a runner-up for PC Gamer US "2002 Best Sports Game" award, which ultimately went to Tiger Woods PGA Tour 2003. The Dreamcast version was a finalist for the Academy of Interactive Arts & Sciences' 2000 "Console Sports Game of the Year" and "Overall Console Game of the Year" awards, both of which went to SSX.

Notes

References

External links

Virtua Tennis Game Manual

1999 video games
Arcade video games
Dreamcast games
Mobile games
Sega-AM3 games
Sega arcade games
N-Gage games
Windows games
Game Boy Advance games
Video games developed in Japan
Virtua Tennis
Tennis video games
Multiplayer and single-player video games